Ermes Paterlini (born 18 March 1947, in Sestri Levante) is an Italian retired footballer. He played as a goalkeeper. He played for Sestri Levante youth teams and was bought by Sampdoria in 1967. At the time Sampdoria played in Serie A and he was the  third goalkeeper behind Piero Battara and Enzo Matteucci. He played his first and only match in Serie A on the Easter of 1968. After three years at Sampdoria he went to Taranto and Mantova, where he never played, and then continued his career in lower series

Height: 1,86m

Nationality: Italy

Position: Goalkeeper

Current club: Retired

Career 
1967-68 Sampdoria A 1 0
1968-69 Sampdoria A 0 0
1969-70 Sampdoria A 0 0
1970-71 Taranto B 0 0
1971-72 Mantova A 0 0
1972-73 Savona C 32 0
1973-74 Savona C 38 0
1974-75 Chieti C 31 0
1975-76 Treviso C 3 0
1976-77 Sestri Levante D
1977-78 Sestri Levante D
1978-79 Sestri Levante D
1979-80 Sammargheritese Prom.
1980-81 Sammargheritese Prom.
1981-82 Entella Int.
1982-83 Riva Trigoso Prom.
1983-84 Riva Trigoso Prom.
1986-87 Sestri Levante Prom.

References

Living people
1947 births
Italian footballers
Association football goalkeepers